Nguyễn Thanh Bình may refer to:

Nguyễn Thanh Bình (politician)
Nguyễn Thanh Bình (footballer, born 1987)
Nguyễn Thanh Bình (footballer, born 2000)